Comrat (Russian and ) is a city and municipality in Moldova and the capital of the autonomous region of Gagauzia. It is located in the south of the country, on the Ialpug River. In 2014, Comrat's population was 20,113, of which the vast majority are Gagauzians.

History 

Comrat was first settled as early as 1443, with other sources claiming it was founded in 1789. Nevertheless, the settlement was sparsely populated until the new russian government issued a decree in 1819 to resettle the region with Bulgarians and other nationalities from across the Danube.

In 1906, the village revolted against the Russian authorities and proclaimed the autonomous (but not independent) Comrat Republic. The village received town privileges in 1952.

During the time when the town was part of Moldavian SSR, Comrat's industry was geared toward the production of butter, wine, and rugs, the latter ornated with Moldavian motifs. The Comrat State University was established in 2002.

Population 
1989: 25,800 (official census)

1991: 27,500 (estimate)
1996: 27,400 (estimate)
2004: 23,429 (official census)
2006: 22,369 (estimate)
2011: 24,135 (estimate)
2014: 20,113 (official census)

Economy 

Comrat is situated in the southern wine zone of Moldova. It is known for production of red wine and muscat. In Comrat and its suburbs there are about 10 wineries.

Food production is very developed in the city. Comrat is a home for food processing factories, alcohol production, and an oil processing plant (the first and only one in Moldova).

There is also such economic agents as a ferro-concrete factory, furniture productions, wood processing, production of plastic windows and doors, cattle butcheries, and transport companies.

Wineries
Comrat Wines - the oldest winery located in the south of Republic of Moldova.

Aur-Vin is a Moldovan wine producer from Comrat. This factory takes part of the Moldovan wine producer Dionis Club.

Culture

Sports 
Football clubs, FC Olimp Comrat and Univer-Oguzsport are based in Comrat.

Notable people
 Petar Draganov (1857 in Komrat - 1928) Russian philologist and Slavist 
 Reuven Shari (1903 in Comrat – 1989) was a Russian-born Israeli politician
 Alexandru Bârlădeanu (1911 in Comrat – 1997) a Romanian Marxian economist who was prominent during the Communist regime, sidelined in 1968
 Sorana Gurian (1913 in Comrat – 1956) a writer, journalist, and translator, emigrated to Israel and France
 Anatoliy Blashku (born 1944 in Komrat) was the Minister of Industry of Transnistria, a Moldovan who moved to Tiraspol as a teenager
 Alexandru Stoianoglo (born 1967 in Comrat) a Moldovan politician and member of the Parliament of Moldova since 2009.
 Irina Vlah (born 1974 in Comrat) a Moldovan politician, Governor (Başkan) of the Autonomous Territorial Unit of Gagauzia
 Igor Cobileanski (born 1974 in Comrat) a Moldovan film director
 Mihai Cojusea (born 1978 in Comrat) a Moldavian football striker who plays for CF Gagauziya
Alexander Romanov (born 1990 in Comrat) a Moldavian UFC heavyweight fighter

International relations

Twin towns — Sister cities

Comrat is twinned with:

 Erzsébetváros, Budapest region, Hungary.
 Pendik, Istanbul region, Turkey;
 Hendek, Turkey;
 Sapanca, Turkey;
 Kucukkuyu, Turkey;
 Isparta, Turkey;
 North Nicosia, Northern Cyprus;
 Tatlısu, Northern Cyprus;
 Moscow region Sokolniki, Russia;
 Grozny, Russia;
 Bavly, Tatarstan, Russia;
 Bolhrad, Ukraine;

Geography

Climate
Comrat has a humid continental climate (Dfb, bordering on Dfa), characterized by warm summers and  cool, drier winters with snow. Winter lows are often below . The average annual precipitation is relatively low.

Gallery

References

External links
Official website

 
Cities and towns in Moldova
Municipalities of Moldova
Bendersky Uyezd
Tighina County (Romania)
Ținutul Nistru
Gagauzia
1789 establishments in Europe